was a Japanese sprinter who in 1935 jointly held the 100 m world record at 10.3 seconds. Four other men had clocked 10.3 s in 1935 or earlier, and Takayoshi was the only Asian person among them. He competed in various sprint events at the 1932 and 1936 Olympics and finished sixth in the 100 m in 1932. In retirement Yoshioka worked as an athletics coach.

See also
World Record progression 100 m men

References

External links
 

1909 births
1984 deaths
Japanese male sprinters
Olympic male sprinters
Olympic athletes of Japan
Athletes (track and field) at the 1932 Summer Olympics
Athletes (track and field) at the 1936 Summer Olympics
Japan Championships in Athletics winners
University of Tsukuba alumni